Jordan A. Olivar (January 30, 1915 – October 17, 1990) was an American football player and coach.  He served as the head football coach at Villanova College—now known as Villanova University—from 1943 to 1948, at Loyola University of Los Angeles—now known as Loyola Marymount University—from 1949 to 1951, and at Yale University from 1952 to 1962, compiling an overall record of 111–63–8.  Olivar led the Yale Bulldogs to two Ivy League championships, in 1956 and 1960.  The 1960 Yale team finished the season ranked 14 in the AP Poll, which is the most recent year end poll in which Yale has been within the top 25. He died of lung cancer on October 17, 1990 at his home in Inglewood, California.

Head coaching record

College football

References

1915 births
1990 deaths
American football tackles
Loyola Lions football coaches
Villanova Wildcats football coaches
Villanova Wildcats football players
Yale Bulldogs football coaches
High school basketball coaches in Pennsylvania
High school football coaches in Pennsylvania
Sportspeople from Brooklyn
Players of American football from New York City
Deaths from lung cancer in California
Players of American football from Inglewood, California